51 Andromedae, abbreviated 51 And and formally named Nembus , is the 5th brightest star in the northern constellation of Andromeda, very slightly dimmer than the Andromeda Galaxy also being of 4th magnitude. It is an orange K-type giant star with an apparent magnitude of +3.57 and is about 169 light-years from the Earth/solar system.  It is traditionally depicted as one of the two northern, far upper ends of the mythological, chained-to-the-rocks princess, the other being binary star system Gamma Andromedae.

The suffix notation indicates a mild enhancement of cyanogen absorption lines in its spectrum. This star has 1.8 times the mass of the Sun and it has expanded to 21.3 times the Sun's radius. It is radiating 142 times the Sun's luminosity from its enlarged photosphere at an effective temperature of 4,951 K.

Nomenclature 

51 Andromedae is the star's Flamsteed designation. Ptolemy included this star in Andromeda in the Almagest. It was for a time moved into the greater form of Perseus envisioned by Johann Bayer as Upsilon Persei. Flamsteed oversaw its constellation reverting and the International Astronomical Union (IAU) made his 51 Andromedae its official designation in 1930.

The star bore the name Nembus, of undetermined origin and meaning, in Bayer's Uranometria (1603) and Bode's star atlas Uranographia (1801). In 2016, the IAU organized a Working Group on Star Names (WGSN) to catalog and standardize proper names for stars. The WGSN approved the name Nembus for this star on 5 September 2017 and it is now so included in the List of IAU-approved Star Names.

References

External links 
 wikisky.org
 http://www.alcyone-software.com/cgi-bin/search.pl?object=HR0464 
 Image 51 Andromedae

Andromedae, 51
Andromeda (constellation)
K-type giants
0464
007607
009927
Durchmusterung objects
Persei, upsilon